The 1965 All-Big Eight Conference football team consists of American football players chosen by various organizations for All-Big Eight Conference teams for the 1965 NCAA University Division football season.  The selectors for the 1965 season included the Associated Press (AP).

Offensive selections

Ends
 Freeman White, Nebraska (AP)
 Tony Jeter, Nebraska (AP)

Tackles
 Dennis Carlson, Nebraska (AP)
 Francis Peay, Missouri (AP)

Guards
 Dick Pratt, Kansas (AP)
 LaVerne Allers, Nebraska (AP)

Centers
 Dick Kasperek, Iowa State (AP)
 Larry Ferraro, Colorado

Backs
 Gary Lane, Missouri (AP)
 Frank Solich, Nebraska (AP)
 Charlie Brown, Missouri (AP)
 Walt Garrison, Oklahoma State (AP)

Defensive selections

Defensive ends
 Sam Harris, Colorado (AP)
 Bill Matan, Kansas State (AP)

Defensive tackles
 Walt Barnes, Nebraska (AP)
 Bruce Van Dyke, Missouri (AP)

Middle guards
 Charlie Harper, Oklahoma State (AP)

Linebackers
 Carl McAdams, Oklahoma (AP)
 Mike Kennedy, Nebraska (AP)
 Steve Sidwell, Colorado (AP)

Defensive backs
 Johnny Roland, Missouri (AP)
 Hale Irwin, Colorado (AP)
 Larry Wachholtz, Nebraska (AP)

Key
AP = Associated Press

See also
 1965 College Football All-America Team

References

All-Big Seven Conference football team
All-Big Eight Conference football teams